The 2010 Meydan FEI Nations Cup was the 2010 edition of the FEI Nations Cup, a premier international team Grand Prix show jumping competition run by the FEI and sponsored by the Meydan Group from Dubai. It was held at eight European venues from May 14 to August 6, 2010.

2010 show schedule

Final standings 

The national equestrian federation of  refrained the start in the Meydan FEI Nations Cup second time after 2009, so Poland moved into the Meydan FEI Nations Cup for the 2010 season. Because of a decision of the Court of Arbitration for Sport the team of  Great Britain was allowed participate in the 2010 Meydan FEI Nations Cup.

At the end of the season, Spain, Sweden, Switzerland and Poland were relegated to the 2011 FEI Nations Cup Promotional League.

External links 
Official website

2010 in show jumping
Meydan FEI Nations Cup